Fasciitis is an inflammation of the fascia, which is the connective tissue surrounding muscles, blood vessels and nerves.

In particular, it often involves one of the following diseases: 
 Necrotizing fasciitis
 Plantar fasciitis
 Ischemic fasciitis, classified by the World Health Organization, 2020, as a specific tumor form in the category of fibroblastic and myofibroblastic tumors.  
 Eosinophilic fasciitis
 Paraneoplastic fasciitis

References

External links 

Inflammations